Creevelea Abbey is a medieval Franciscan friary and National Monument located in Dromahair, County Leitrim, Ireland.
Creeveley Abbey is now in use for as a grave yard.

Location
Creevelea Abbey is located west of Dromahair, on the west bank of the Bonet River.

History
Creevelea Friary was founded in 1508 by Eóghan O'Rourke, Lord of West Bréifne, and his wife Margaret O'Brian, daughter of a King of Thomond. The friary was accidentally burned in 1536 and was rebuilt by Brian Ballach O'Rourke. In 1590 Richard Bingham stabled his horses at Creevelea during his pursuit of Brian O'Rourke, who had sheltered survivors of the Spanish Armada. Dissolved c. 1598.

Sir Tadhg O'Rourke (d. 1605), last King of West Bréifne and Thaddeus Francis O'Rourke (d. 1735), Bishop of Killala are buried here. Another house was built for the friars in 1618 and Creevelea was reoccupied by friars in 1642. The Franciscans were driven out by the Cromwellian Army in the 1650s. After the Restoration, the abbey remained in use until 1837.

Buildings
The remains consist of the church (nave, chancel, transept and choir), chapter house, cloister and domestic buildings. The bell-tower was converted to living quarters in the 17th century. At one point in its history the church was covered with a thatched roof. Carved in the cloister is an image of Saint Francis of Assisi preaching to birds.

Archaeological Preservation
The site is preserved as a national monument.

References and Notes

Notes

Citations

Primary sources

Secondary sources

 

Religion in County Leitrim
Archaeological sites in County Leitrim
National Monuments in County Leitrim
Franciscan monasteries in the Republic of Ireland